The Global Landscapes Forum (GLF) is a multi-stakeholder forum to participate in landscape approach.

Overview 
The GLF is a platform on sustainable land use. Since 2013, over 4,400 organizations and 190,000 people have taken part in Forum events in person and online. It is led by the Center for International Forestry Research (CIFOR).

History 
The inaugural GLF event took place alongside the 2013 United Nations Climate Change Conference (COP 19) in Warsaw, Poland. It heralded the merger of Forest Day and Agriculture and Rural Development Day, reflecting a scientific climate which looked at breaking down research silos and utilizing an integrated landscape approach. The first four major GLF events were held annually on the sidelines of the United Nations Climate Change Conference.

Following a major funding injection from the German government, the GLF moved to establish a secretariat in Bonn, Germany. This is part of an effort on the part of the German government and the city of Bonn to establish a "sustainability cluster" in the city.

Partners 

CIFOR serves as the implementing organization of the GLF, and the current coordinating partners are the World Bank, and the United Nations Environment Programme.

As of 2017, the host country partners are the German Federal Ministry for the Environment, Nature Conservation, Building and Nuclear Safety (BMUB), and Federal Ministry for Economic Cooperation and Development (BMZ).

Events

Predecessor Events 
Following a move towards more integrated landscape approaches in both the forestry and agriculture sides of the research for development sphere, the Global Landscapes Forum was born out of a merger of Forest Day and Agriculture and Rural Development Day (ARDD), which had been annual side events at the United Nations Climate Change conference (COP) since 2007 and 2009, respectively.

Forest Day  

Forest Day was an annual COP side event co-organized by CIFOR and the Collaborative Partnership on Forests, since the 2007 United Nations Climate Change Conference (COP13) in Bali, Indonesia.

As of 2012, by resolution of the United Nations General Assembly on November 28, 2012, Forest Day became the International Day of Forests. Thus the sixth and final Forest Day was held on the sidelines of the 2012 United Nations Climate Change Conference (COP18) in Doha, Qatar.

Agriculture and Rural Development Day 

Agriculture and Rural Development Day (ARDD) was an annual COP side event. The first event took place as a side event at the 2009 United Nations Climate Change Conference (COP15) in Copenhagen, Denmark.

The fifth and final ARDD, called Agriculture, Landscapes, and Livelihoods Day 5 (ALL-5), took place alongside Forest Day on the sidelines of the COP18.

Annual Events 
The first major GLF event took place in Warsaw, Poland during the 2013 United Nations Climate Change Conference (COP19).

The second major GLF event was held alongside the 2014 United Nations Climate Change Conference (COP20) from December 6–7, 2014. There were 1700 attendees and 95 organizations in attendance.

This event saw the launch of the Youth in Landscapes initiative.

The third major GLF event was held alongside the 2015 United Nations Climate Change Conference (COP21), December 5–6, 2015. There were 3200 attendees from 135 countries, including 19 Ministers and Heads of State, and 148 organizations. Notably, 200 indigenous peoples’ representatives were sponsored to attend the 2015 Forum, and 45% of those in attendance were female.

Initiatives launched at this event include:
AFR100
Blue Carbon Initiative
Indonesian National Carbon Accounting System (INCAS)
Belantara Foundation
Danone's New Climate Policy

The fourth major GLF event was held alongside the 2016 United Nations Climate Change Conference (COP22), November 16, 2016. During this event, the German Federal Ministry for the Environment, Nature Conservation, Building and Nuclear Safety (BMUB) and Federal Ministry for Economic Cooperation and Development (BMZ) announced a major injection of core funding to support the development of the GLF for the next five years.

Initiatives launched at this event include:
 Climate Resilience through Sweet potato (CReSP) 
 Tropical Forest Alliance 2020 (TFA 2020) African Palm Oil Initiative(APOI)
 Global Peatlands Initiative
 Earth Innovation Institute Produce and Protect Platform
 Five Great Forests Initiative
 Atlas of Deforestation and Industrial Plantations in Borneo

Following the major injection of funding from the German government during the Marrakesh event, the GLF moved to establish a more permanent presence in Bonn, Germany. While the 2017 United Nations Climate Change Conference (COP23) was held in Bonn the same year from November 6–17, 2017, the Global Landscapes Forum event took place just over a month later on December 19–20, 2017. This marked the first year that the GLF existed as its own entity and not as a COP side event. For the first time, the Wangari Maathai Forest Champion Award was presented at the GLF.

Thematic Events 
The first Investment Case event took place on June 10–11, 2015 at the Royal Society in London, United Kingdom. It was an invitation-only symposium with 220 attendees from the finance sector. It was coordinated by the European Investment Bank, UN Environment, the World Bank, and the Program on Forests (PROFOR). Sessions were hosted by the Organisation for Economic Co-operation and Development (OECD), United Nations Convention to Combat Desertification (UNCCD), Unilever, and the Climate Bonds Initiative.

The road map from this event were presented at a land use side event 14th World Forestry Congress (WFC XIV) in Durban, South Africa, the theme of which was Forests and People: Investing in a Sustainable Future.

Other key outcomes were presented to the United Nations Framework Convention on Climate Change (UNFCCC) Standing Committee on Finance (SCF) workplan for 2015.

National and Policy Dialogues 
Riau, Indonesia 2017: Laws and Best Practices for Reducing Fire and Haze

The AFR100 initiative was launched at the GLF in Paris, 2015, and was also supported by the German government. The GLF supported the Second Annual Partnership Conference in 2017, which brought together 23 partner countries, restoration champions, and technical partners such as the Food and Agriculture Organization of the United Nations (FAO), International Union for the Conservation of Nature (IUCN), New Partnership for Africa’s Development (NEPAD Agency), and World Vision.

Organized with CI FOR, this policy dialogue workshop looked at gender-responsive Forest and Landscape Restoration.

Controversies

External links 
 Global Landscapes Forum
 Landscape News

See also 
 United Nations Climate Change Conference

References 

International sustainability organizations
International conferences
Organisations based in Bonn
Organizations established in 2013